Live Retaliation is the first live DVD from the Norwegian metal band Enslaved. Some pressings of the DVD included a bonus EP.

DVD track listing
 "Intro" – 2:03
 "Convoys to Nothingness" –  8:04
 "Jotunblod" –  3:52
 "The Voices" –  5:42
 "As Fire Swept Clean the Earth" –  6:39
 "Heimdallr" –  5:20
 "Loke" –  3:42
 "Queen of Night" –  5:43
 "Mardraum" –  5:21
 "Ridicule Swarm" –  4:48
 "Wotan 3:38
 "Retribution for the Dead" –  4:38
 "Thanking the Band" –  0:39
 "Slaget I Skogen Bortenfor" –  7:56

Bonus EP track listing
 "Sleipnr (previously unreleased)" –  4:08
 "Svarte Vidder (pre-production)" –  8:27
 "Wotan (pre-production)" –  4:35
 "Gylfaginning (pre-production)" –  5:19
 "Jotunblod (pre-production)" –  4:10
 "Viking Metal (live)" –  5:01

References 

Enslaved (band) video albums